These fossil fuel power stations burn coal to power steam turbines that generate some or all of the electricity they produce.  Australia's fleet of coal-fired power stations are aging and many are due for decommissioning, and are being replaced by a combination of mostly renewable energy. In early 2017, 75% of the coal-fired power stations in the country were operating beyond their original design life.

The declining cost of renewable energy sources, such as solar power, wind power and battery storage, means it is unlikely a new coal-fired power station will ever be built in Australia.  The Liddell Power Station is expected to be decommissioned and replaced by battery storage in 2023.

New South Wales 

Total (MW): 10,240

Queensland 

Total (MW): 8,080

Victoria 

Total (MW): 4,730

Western Australia 

Total (MW): 1,717

 Kwinana A (240 MW) was shut down in 2010, and Kwinana C (400 MW) was shut down in 2015.

Other states/territories 
The Australian Capital Territory does not use coal or oil to generate electricity. The Kingston Powerhouse being the last coal-fired power station in the territory, which was decommissioned in 1957.

The Northern Territory relies predominantly on natural gas, as well as various renewable energy sources. Likewise, it has no functioning coal-fired power stations.

South Australia previously had a number of coal power stations. The last to be closed were the Northern and Playford B power stations.

Tasmania has no functioning coal-fired power stations, instead using primarily hydroelectricity, with natural gas used as a backup.

See also 
 100% renewable energy
 Energy policy of Australia
 List of natural gas fired power stations in Australia

Notes

Sources

References 

Coal
Coal-fired power stations in Australia
Lists of coal-fired power stations